The following is a list of churches in Cambridge, England:

Active churches and chapels, other than college and school chapels

College and school chapels

Disused churches

Demolished churches

Maps

References 

 List
Churches, Cambridge
Churches
Cambridge
Cambridge